Bunk Sandwiches is a sandwich restaurant chain, based in Portland, Oregon.

History
In 2018, the original location on Morrison closed, leaving restaurants on Alberta and Southeast Water Avenue, in downtown Portland, and below the Wonder Ballroom. The Alberta restaurant offered free sandwiches on National Grilled Cheese Day.

The Bunk Bar below the Wonder Ballroom operated from 2012 to 2019. The Alberta location closed in 2020, during the COVID-19 pandemic.

Bunk expanded to Williamsburg, Brooklyn in November 2015; the restaurant closed in January 2017.

Bunk has been featured on Food Network's Diners, Drive-Ins and Dives.

Reception
In 2015, Matthew Korfhage of Willamette Week included the Pork Belly Cubano in his list of "12 Wonders of Portland Food". Alex Frane included Bunk in Thrillist's 2020 list of "The Best Sandwiches in Portland to Order Right Now".

See also

 List of Diners, Drive-Ins and Dives episodes

References

External links

 
 Bunk Bar
 Bunk Sandwiches at the Food Network
 Bunk Sandwiches at Portland Monthly
 Bunk Sandwiches Alberta at Travel+Leisure
 Bunk Sandwiches at Zomato

Companies based in Portland, Oregon
Defunct restaurants in New York City
Restaurant chains in the United States
Restaurants in Brooklyn
Restaurants in Portland, Oregon
Sandwich restaurants